A riddle is a large sieve used to separate soil or compost particles, or for separating soil from vegetables.

Etymology

English "riddle" is from Middle English ridelle "coarse sieve," from late Old English hriddel "sieve," altered by dissimilation from Old English hridder "sieve"

Description
A riddle may be square, rectangular or circular in shape, with a rim made from wood, metal, plastic or beechwood, holding in place a steel wire mesh that may either be handwoven or machine-made.

A riddle is typically used to improve soil quality by allowing the gardener to sieve through soil and remove stones, twigs, large lumps of clay etc. and hence provide a finer tilth. Smaller riddles can be used to separate soil very finely for seeds and early potting. Riddles may also be used to help remove soil from harvested vegetables.

See also
Garden tool
Riddle drum

References

Gardening tools